Hitt, Illinois may refer to:
Hitt, Carroll County, Illinois, an unincorporated community in Carroll County
Hitt, LaSalle County, Illinois, an unincorporated community in LaSalle County